HMS Marie Antoinette was a 10-gun two-masted sloop. She was built in France and was originally called Marie Antoinette. During the French Revolution, she was rerequisitoned and renamed Convention Nationale. A British squadron under Commodore Ford captured her in 1793. The Royal Navy took her into service under her original name, Marie Antoinette. She took part in operations around Saint-Domingue until her crew mutinied in 1797 and carried her into a French port. Her subsequent fate is unknown.

French service 
Marie Antoinette was the merchant schooner Marie Antoinette. In 1793, she was requisitioned at Saint-Domingue and commissioned in the French Navy as the 20-gun corvette, Convention Nationale.

Capture and commissioning
In September 1793, at the request of French Royalists, Commodore Ford's squadron attacked Saint-Domingue and Jérémie in the Caribbean. On 23 September 1793, the British captured four merchant vessels at L'Islet, and on 29 September, seven at Flamande Bay. At Môle-Saint-Nicolas, on 23 September, HMS Goelan, and  had captured the schooner Convention Nationale, which was under the command of Mons. Anquetin. She was registered on 12 May 1794.

Ford gave command of the renamed Marie Antoinette to Lieutenant John Perkins "an Officer of Zeal, Vigilance and Activity." In 1794 Marie Antoinette made up part of the squadron commanded by the newly promoted Rear-Admiral John Ford and accompanying Brigadier-General John Whyte that briefly captured Port-au-Prince. Records indicate that Marie Antoinette did not play any significant role in the siege. At the time some forty-five vessels lay in harbour and these were all made prizes. 

In 1796 she made up part of a small squadron that captured the schooner Charlotte and brig Sally. Perkins remained with her until he was promoted master and commander into the 14-gun brig  in early 1797. 

It is not clear who was captain of Marie Antoinette on 27 February when she impressed two seamen from the ship Fame, of New York, and under master John Ablin.

Mutiny and fate
Command of Marie Antoinette passed to Lieutenant John McInerheny. On 7 July 1797 some of the crew, under the leadership of her quartermaster, a Mr. Jackson, mutinied. They murdered Lieutenant McInerheny (also M'Inerkeny or McInderhenny) and another officer by throwing them overboard, and restrained the remaining officers and loyal crew. The mutineers then took her into the French port of Gonaïves in Saint-Domingue. The British were able to capture one of the mutineers, William Jacobs; in February 1799 they hanged and gibbeted him.

The subsequent fate of Marie Antoinette and that of most of the crew is unknown. Hermione'''s crew also murdered their captain and took their ship into an enemy port, La Guaira in Venezuela.

Citations

References
 Clowes, W. Laird, et al. (1897-1903) The royal navy: a history from the earliest times to the present. (Boston: Little, Brown and Co.; London: S. Low, Marston and Co.).
 
 
 
Guttridge, Leonard F.  (2006) Mutiny: A History of Naval Insurrection. (Naval Institute Press). 
 Lowrie, William ed., (1832) American State Papers: Documents, Legislative and Executive, of the Congress of the United States. From the 1st session of the 1st to the 3rd session of the 13th congress, inclusive: commencing March 3, 1789, and ending March 3, 1815''. (Gales and Seaton). 
 
  

 

Royal Navy mutinies
Schooners of the Royal Navy
1790s ships
Ships built in France
Maritime incidents in 1797
Ships of the French Navy